St. Thomas Township or Saint Thomas Township may refer to the following places in the United States:

 St. Thomas Township, Pembina County, North Dakota
 St. Thomas Township, Franklin County, Pennsylvania

See also

Thomas Township (disambiguation)

Township name disambiguation pages